Ballochia is a genus of plant in the family Acanthaceae. It is endemic to Socotra. It contains the following species (but this list may be incomplete):
 Ballochia amoena Balf.f.
 Ballochia atro-virgata Balf.f.
 Ballochia rotundifolia Balf.f.

 
Acanthaceae genera
Taxonomy articles created by Polbot
Taxa named by Isaac Bayley Balfour